The Titan Missile Museum, also known as Air Force Facility Missile Site 8 or as Titan II ICBM Site 571-7, is a former ICBM (intercontinental ballistic missile) site located about  south of Tucson, Arizona in the United States. It was constructed in 1963 and deactivated in 1984. It is now a museum run by the nonprofit Arizona Aerospace Foundation and includes an inert Titan II missile in the silo, as well as the original launch facilities.

It was declared a National Historic Landmark in 1994. It is the only Titan II complex to survive from the late Cold War period.

Underground facilities 
The underground facilities consist of a three-level Launch Control Center, the eight level silo containing the missile and its related equipment, and the connecting structures of cableways (access tunnels), blast locks, and the access portal and equipment elevator.

The top level of the silo permits viewing the silo missile doors.  Level 3 houses a large diesel generator. Level 7 provides access to the lowest part of the launch duct.   Visitors on the "Beyond the Blast Doors" tour are allowed to stand directly underneath the missile.  Level 8, at  underground, houses the propellant pumps.

Titan II missile 
The  Titan II missile inside the silo has neither warhead nor fuel, allowing it to be safely displayed to visitors.  In accordance with a US/USSR agreement, the silo doors are permanently blocked from opening more than half way. The dummy reentry vehicle mounted on the missile has a prominent hole cut in it to prove it is inert. All the support facilities at the site remain intact, complete with all of their original equipment.

The silo became operational in 1963 and was deactivated in 1984 as part of President Reagan's policy (announced in 1981) of decommissioning the Titan II missiles as part of a weapon systems modernization program. All operational Titan II silos throughout the country were demolished, including 18 sites around McConnell AFB in Wichita, Kansas, 17 sites near Little Rock AFB, Arkansas (one additional site previously damaged beyond repair in a mishap/non-nuclear explosion) and 17 other sites by Davis-Monthan AFB and Tucson except for this one. It is now a National Historic Landmark.

Yield and warhead

The Titan II was the largest operational land based nuclear missile ever used by the United States. The missile had one W53 warhead with a yield of 9 Megatons (9,000 kilotons).

At launch, orders from the National Command Authority would have specified one of three pre-programmed targets which, for security reasons, were unknown to the crew.   The missile base that is now the Titan Missile Museum (complex 571-7 of the 390th Strategic Missile Wing) was, at the time of closure, programmed to strike "Target Two".  The missile's computer could hold up to three targets, and the target selected was determined by Strategic Air Command headquarters. To change the selected target, the crew commander pressed the appropriate button on the launch console.  Target 2, which is classified to this day but was assumed to be within the borders of the former Soviet Union, was designated as a ground burst, suggesting that the target was a hardened facility such as a Soviet missile base. Targets could be selected for air or ground burst, but the selection was determined by Strategic Air Command.

Tourist attractions
The Titan Missile Museum is located at 1580 West Duval Mine Road, Sahuarita, on I-19. 

A visitor center for the site features a gift shop, a small museum and guided tours of the site. The museum is intended to put the Titan II within the context of the Cold War. Paid tours are available for hire, offering education about the history of the Titan II site and program, as well as a closer look at many features of the complex. Relics include hardstands for fuel storage containers and the associated control vehicles, restored engines from a Titan II missile, and a re-entry vehicle.

Tours below ground may include the control room, the cableways (tunnels), the silo, antenna tower and more. More information can be found and reservations may be made via the museum website. Several times each month, a more extensive "top to bottom" tour is available. This tour takes up to 5 hours and accommodates a maximum of six people. Prior reservations required.  The top-to-bottom tour is not handicapped accessible.

Several scenes in the 1996 film Star Trek: First Contact were shot at the site. The missile itself was depicted as the launch vehicle for the film's Phoenix spacecraft, the first warp prototype.

Gallery

See also
 Missile launch facility
 Minuteman Missile National Historic Site
 Strategic missile forces museum in Ukraine – Similar museum in the former Soviet Union

References

External links 

 Titan Missile Museum
 NPR: Missile Museum Sparks Cold War Memories (February 9, 2007)
 NYT: Strange Love (January 5, 2007)
 

Aerospace museums in Arizona
Cold War museums in the United States
Military and war museums in Arizona
Museums in Pima County, Arizona
Military facilities on the National Register of Historic Places in Arizona
National Historic Landmarks in Arizona
National Register of Historic Places in Pima County, Arizona
Nuclear missiles of the United States
History of Pima County, Arizona
1963 establishments in Arizona
Projects established in 1963